Francisco V. Coching (January 29, 1919 – September 1, 1998) was a Filipino comic books illustrator and writer and is regarded as one of the “pillars of the Philippine Komiks Industry”. He served as both illustrator and writer for his comic book stories, Coching is referred to as the "King of Komiks", and as the "Dean of Philippine Comics". In 2014, he was posthumously conferred as a National Artist for Visual Arts, the highest honor for artists in the Philippines.

Biography
Coching was born in Buting, Pasig, Rizal Province in the Philippines. He was the son of Gregorio Coching, a Filipino novelist in the Tagalog-language magazine Liwayway.

Coching was unable to finish his studies in order to be an illustrator for Liwayway under the apprenticeship of Tony Velasquez. In 1934, at the age of fifteen, Coching created Bing Bigotilyo (Silahis Magazine). Coching had been influenced by Francisco Reyes, another pioneer in the Filipino comic book industry. In 1935, he created Marabini (an amazon warrior in Bahaghari Magazine). World War II interrupted Coching’s career in comics. He became a guerrillero (guerilla) for the Kamagong Unit of the Hunters-ROTC resistance organization.

After the Second World War, Coching created Hagibis, a Tarzan-like and Kulafu-like character in Liwayway Magazine. Other creations by Coching were Sabas, ang Barbaro (Sabas, the Barbarian, wherein the storyline was set during the Filipino revolution against Spain), Pedro Penduko, El Indio, Bertong Balutan, Don Cobarde, Ang Kaluluwa ni Dante (Dante's Soul), Pagano (Pagan), Haring Ulupong, Dumagit, Lapu-Lapu, Bulalakaw, Waldas, Talipandas, Palasig, Movie Fan, Anak ni Hagibis (a sequel to Hagibis), Gat Sibasib (another sequel to Hagibis), Satur, Dimasalang, Bella Bandida, El Vibora, Sa Ngalan ng Batas, and El Negro. El Negro (1974) was his last komiks novel.

After 39 years in the komiks industry, Coching retired in 1973 at the age of 54. Coching was able to produce 53 komiks novels overall.

Death
He died at age 78 on September 1, 1998.

Influence
Coching influenced many other Filipino illustrators. Among them were Noly Panaligan, Federico C. Javinal, Carlos Lemos, Celso Trinidad, Emil Quizon-Cruz, Nestor Redondo, Alfredo Alcala, and Emil Rodriguez.

His 1973 illustration of Lapu-Lapu was among the series of national postage stamps based on Philippine comics released on November 15, 2004 by PhilPost.

On Coching's 100th birth anniversary, Ayala Museum held an exhibition titled Images of Nation: F.V. Coching, Komiks at Kultura, which ran from October 30 to February 3, 2019.

Film adaptations
Almost all of Coching’s komiks novels were adapted into films, with the exception of three titles. Among those that were made into a film was El Negro in 1974. One of his most famous works is Pedro Penduko, which has 6 film adaptations (and counting), 2 small screen adaptations and a couple of cameos.

Awards
In 1981, Coching obtained the Makasining na Komiks Award in the Tanging Parangal for Comics Art from the Manila Commission of Arts and Culture.

In 1984, Coching received the Komiks Operation Brotherhood Inc. (KOMOPEB) Life Achievement Award.

In 1998, he received the Award of Excellence from the government of Pasay.

Coching received the nomination as a National Artist of the Philippines for the Visual Arts in 1999 and in 2001. On June 20, 2014, Coching was posthumously named as a National Artist for the Visual Arts by virtue of Proclamation No. 808, series of 2014.

See also
Cris CaGuintuan

References

External links
The Life and Art of Francisco Coching

1919 births
1998 deaths
Artists from Metro Manila
Filipino comics artists
Filipino comics writers
National Artists of the Philippines
People from Pasig
Writers from Metro Manila